Henry De La Warr Flood (September 2, 1865 – December 8, 1921) was a representative from the Commonwealth of Virginia to the United States House of Representatives, brother of U.S. Representative Joel West Flood and uncle of U.S. Senator Harry Flood Byrd.

Early and family life
Flood was born September 2, 1865, in "Eldon" in Appomattox County, Virginia, to former Virginia state senator and CSA Major Joel Walker Flood (1839–1916), and his first wife, the former Ella Faulkner (1844–1885). He had an elder sister, Eleanor Bolling Flood Byrd (1864–1957), and a younger half-brother Joel West Flood (1894–1964). Flood attended public schools in Appomattox and Richmond, Virginia. He received his undergraduate degree from Washington and Lee University and his law degree from the University of Virginia.

On April 18, 1914, the middle-aged bachelor married Anna Florence Portner (1888–1966), daughter of German beer brewer and inventor Robert Portner. They married at All Souls Unitarian Church in Washington, D.C., followed by a reception at the Pan American Union Building. His young namesake Henry D. Flood III died in 1920, the year of his birth, as had their daughter Anna Portner Flood in 1916. Their children Bolling Byrd Flood (1915–2000) and Eleanor Faulkner Flood Schoellkopf (1917–1975) survived their parents.

Career
Flood was admitted to the bar in 1886 and commenced practice in Appomattox, Virginia. He was elected Commonwealth's Attorney for Appomattox County in 1891, 1895, and 1899.

Voters also elected Flood as Appomattox County's delegate to the Virginia House of Delegates from 1887 to 1891 (a part-time position). He served as member of the Senate of Virginia from 1891 to 1903. He was a delegate to the Virginia Constitutional Convention of 1901. He was an unsuccessful candidate for election to the Fifty-fifth Congress.

Flood was elected as a Democrat to the Fifty-seventh and to the ten succeeding Congresses and served until his death (March 4, 1901 – December 8, 1921). In his first term, he proposed creation of what ultimately became Shenandoah National Park more than a decade after his death, due to the efforts of his nephew Harry F. Byrd, who became one of Virginia's U.S. Senators in 1933.

Flood served as chair of the Committee on Foreign Affairs (Sixty-second through Sixty-fifth Congresses), Committee on Territories (Sixty-second Congress).

In 1911, he was responsible for the Flood amendment to the enabling act for New Mexico statehood, which provided for a simple majority to ratify amendments to the New Mexico Constitution. In 1917, he helped to bring the United States into World War I as the author of the resolutions declaring a state of war to exist between the United States and Germany and Austria-Hungary.

Death and legacy
Henry died on December 8, 1921, in Washington, D.C.

He was interred in a mausoleum on the courthouse green at Appomattox, Virginia; the courthouse is located in the Appomattox Historic District.

See also
List of United States Congress members who died in office (1900–49)

References

External links 
 
 Henry D. Flood, late a representative from Virginia, Memorial addresses delivered in the House of Representatives and Senate frontispiece 1924

1865 births
1921 deaths
Democratic Party Virginia state senators
Democratic Party members of the Virginia House of Delegates
County and city Commonwealth's Attorneys in Virginia
University of Virginia School of Law alumni
Washington and Lee University alumni
Delegates to Virginia Constitutional Convention of 1901
20th-century American politicians
People from Appomattox County, Virginia
Democratic Party members of the United States House of Representatives from Virginia